This article details the qualifying phase for artistic swimming at the 2020 Summer Olympics. (The Olympics was postponed to at least 2021 due to the COVID-19 pandemic). The competition at these Games will comprise a total of 104 athletes coming from their respective NOCs; each has been allowed to enter a maximum of eight if qualified in the women's team and two if qualified only for the women's duet. NOCs qualified in the team event may select two of the team members to compete in the duet. Host nation Japan is considered the Asian continental representative, having reserved a spot on all events.

For the team competitions, the best ranked NOC in each of the five continental championships, with the exception of the host country Japan which will represent the Asian continent, obtains a secured place for the Games, while the remaining NOCs will compete for the two highest-ranked spots at the 2019 World Aquatics Championships and the three highest-ranked spots at the Olympic Qualification Tournament. For the duet, the best ranked NOC in each of the five continental championships that do not have a qualified team assures a secured spot, while the other seven top-ranked NOCs will be selected through Olympic Qualification Tournament. All 10 NOCs that have already qualified in the team event each automatically qualify two synchronized swimmers (who must be members of the team) to form a duet.

Timeline

Qualification summary

Women's team

Women's duet

 – New Zealand declined the duet quota.

References

qual
Qualification for the 2020 Summer Olympics
2019 in synchronized swimming
2020 in synchronized swimming